THE BEST "Red" is the first best album released by Japanese girl group Kalafina. It was released at the same time as THE BEST "Blue". It was released in a limited CD+Blu-ray edition and a regular CD Only edition.

Track listing

Charts

References

2014 compilation albums
Japanese-language compilation albums
Kalafina albums
Sony Music Entertainment Japan compilation albums
SME Records albums